Things Don't Always Go the Way You Plan is the second mixtape by Australian electronic musician Flume, released on 8 February 2023 through Future Classic. The mixtape follows the release of Palaces in 2022. It includes collaborations with Injury Reserve, Isabella Manfredi and Panda Bear.

The mixtape consists of 10 previously unreleased tracks dating from 2012 to 2021.

Background and recording 
In July 2022, following the release of Flume's previous album, Palaces, he told NME that he had "loads of demos" that totaled "a full album's worth of house music" that he intended on finishing. On 8 November 2022, Flume released an previously unreleased demo from 2014 titled Slugger 1.4 [2014 Export.WAV] to mark 10 years since the release of his 2012 self-titled debut album. In response to positive reception from the track, Flume teased further unreleased demo track releases two days later. In January 2023, he teased that there was "new music coming soon" on social media.

Along with the release of the mixtape on 8 February 2023, Flume explained the background of the project on his Instagram: "It’s been ten years since my first record came out, since then I’ve wrote a lot a lot music and not all of it has seen the light of day. After seeing the reaction to Slugger 1.4 and how much love it got, I figured it would be fun to release more of these forgotten ideas I from my old laptops. The whole process has been quite cathartic."

Release and promotion 
Flume teased new music in late January and early February 2023. On 7 February, he posted "10am PT, Wednesday" (8 February) on social media, along with artwork of a computer desktop with the text "Things Don't Always Go The Way You Plan" in the menu bar, later turning out to be the official cover art and title. On 8 February, it was revealed to be a 10-track mixtape of previously unreleased songs and was released on the same day.

Track listing 
All tracks are produced by Flume.

Charts

References 

2023 mixtape albums
Albums produced by Flume (musician)
Flume (musician) albums